Peretta may refer to:

 Rômulo Peretta (born 1996), Brazilian footballer
 Peretta Peronne, unlicensed female surgeon operating in Paris in the early fifteenth century

See also 

 Perretta